John Joseph Callahan (September 30, 1878 – June 20, 1952) was an American professional baseball catcher. He played in one game for the Philadelphia Athletics of Major League Baseball during the  season. He went hitless in five at bats. He batted and threw right-handed.

Life
Born in Philadelphia, Pennsylvania on September 30, 1878, Callahan became a catcher for the Major League Baseball team known as the Philadelphia Athletics, but played in just one game during the 1903 season. He died in Philadelphia on June 20, 1952, and was interred at the Holy Cross Cemetery in Yeadon, Pennsylvania.

References

Major League Baseball catchers
Philadelphia Athletics players
Baseball players from Philadelphia
1878 births
1952 deaths